The 2010–11 Saudi Crown Prince Cup was the 36th season of the Saudi Crown Prince Cup since its establishment in 1957. This season's competition featured a total of 16 teams, 14 teams from the Pro League, and 2 teams from the qualifying rounds.

Pro League side Al-Hilal were the defending champions and successfully defended their title. Al-Hilal won their fourth Crown Prince Cup title in a row and tenth in total after beating Al-Wehda 5–0 in the final.

Qualifying rounds
All of the competing teams that are not members of the Pro League competed in the qualifying rounds to secure one of 2 available places in the Round of 16. First Division sides Al-Riyadh and Hajer qualified.

Preliminary round 1
The Preliminary Round 1 matches were played on 23 September 2010.

Preliminary round 2
The Preliminary Round 2 matches were played on 29 & 30 September and 1 October 2010.

First round
The First Round matches were played on 6, 7, & 8 October 2010.

Second round
The Second Round matches were played on 20 & 21 October 2010.

Third round
The Third Round matches were played on 31 October 2010.

Final round
The final round matches were played on 9 and 27 November 2010.

Bracket

Note:     H: Home team,   A: Away team

Round of 16
The Round of 16 fixtures were played on 31 January and 1, 2 and 3 February 2011. All times are local, AST (UTC+3).

Quarter-finals
The Quarter-finals fixtures were played on 16 and 17 February 2011. All times are local, AST (UTC+3).

Semi-finals
The Semi-finals fixtures were played on 10 and 11 March 2011. All times are local, AST (UTC+3).

Final

The final was held on 15 April 2011 in the King Fahd International Stadium in Riyadh. All times are local, AST (UTC+3).

Winner

Top goalscorers
As of 15 April 2011

See also
 2011 Saudi Crown Prince Cup Final
 2010–11 Saudi Professional League
 2011 King Cup of Champions

References

Saudi Crown Prince Cup seasons
2010–11 domestic association football cups
Crown Prince Cup